"Yassou Maria" is a song recorded by Greek-British singer Sarbel, written by Alex Papakonstantinou, Marcus Englöf and Markus "Mack" Sepehrmanesh. It is best known as the  entry at the Eurovision Song Contest 2007, held in Helsinki.

It was released as a CD single on March 7, 2007 by Sony BMG Greece, going gold in Greece on June 7, 2007.

Before Eurovision
Before Eurovision, ERT put together a national final to pick the song and singer to represent Greece in the Eurovision Song Contest 2007. They picked Sarbel, Tamta, and Christos Dantis.

Sarbel enlisted the help of popular Swedish-Greek composer Alex Papakonstantinou who is responsible for big hits by Elena Paparizou (the winner for Greece in ).

At the national final, Sarbel was accompanied on stage by four female dancers, with blue lights and fire in the background. He wore black leather pants and a silver shirt. The choreography was complex, which led with some problems with his microphone.

The public chose the song as the winner voting 44.45% while the jury also appointed him the winner giving him 17.46%. All together, he got an average of 39.69% votes.

By order performed:

The CD single was released on March 7, 2007 in Greece and Cyprus by Sony BMG Greece. It includes a duet by Swedish singer Cameron, as well as a remixed song and a Greeklish version of "Yassou Maria". It reached the top position in both countries, being certified gold in Greece.

At Eurovision
The song and singer chosen competed in the Eurovision final in Helsinki, Finland on May 12, 2007. Greece were not required to sing in the semi-final since Anna Vissi, Greece's entry at the 2006 contest, had reached ninth place.

During a draw, Greece was assigned a running order of 10 in the contest. Sarbel appeared after 4 ballads, and before 1 disco song. He went on stage with 4 girls with short dresses. They used the same dance routine as in the Greek national final, but with minor changes. These included the end part, which used ribbons attached to the girls' skirts during the end bridge, with Sarbel as sort of a puppeteer. Later the ribbons were used to make a heart around Sarbel and the girls at the very end.

Track listing
 "Yassou Maria"
 "Mi Chica" (Greek/English/Spanish mix version) [Duet with Persian-Swedish singer Cameron]
 "Yassou Maria" (Greeklish version)
 "Enas Apo Mas" (Anyone of Us – A Stupid Mistake) [Holiday Mix by Dimitris Kontopoulos]

Charts

References

External links
International Sarbel's Forum
Lyrics, "Yassou Maria" at diggiloo.net

Number-one singles in Greece
Columbia Records singles
English-language Greek songs
Eurovision songs of 2007
Eurovision songs of Greece
Sarbel songs
Songs written by Alex P
Song recordings produced by Alex P
Songs written by Marcus Englof
Songs written by Marcus Sepehrmanesh
Sony BMG singles
2007 songs